The Sorel Éperviers (Black Hawks) were a junior ice hockey team in the Quebec Major Junior Hockey League from 1969 to 1981. The team was one of the founding members of the QMJHL. They mostly played at the Colisée Cardin in Sorel-Tracy, Quebec, but also spent a few seasons at the Verdun Auditorium in the Montreal suburb of Verdun, Quebec. Rodrigue Lemoyne served as the team's general manager. Ray Bourque is also the only former Épervier in the Hockey Hall of Fame.

The Éperviers originated in the Quebec Junior Hockey League, and were the league's champion in 1969. Sorel were finalists in the eastern Canadian championship for the George Richardson Memorial Trophy, losing 3 games to 1 to the Montreal Junior Canadiens.

The 1973–74 QMJHL season sparked an offensive explosion, unmatched in Canadian Hockey League history. Sorel set a CHL record of 620 goals scored as a team. Three Sorel players, Pierre Larouche, Michel Deziel and Jacques Cossette, had more than 90 goals and 200 points each. Sorel goaltender Claude Legris also posted the highest goals against average of 4.50 goals per game for a Jacques Plante Memorial Trophy winner.

In 1981 the franchise moved to Granby, Quebec where they became the Granby Bisons. They won the Memorial Cup there in 1996. The franchise is today the Cape Breton Eagles.

NHL alumni

Season-by-season record
 Sorel Éperviers (1969–1977)
 Verdun Éperviers (1977–1979)
 Verdun/Sorel Éperviers (1979–1980)
 Sorel Éperviers (1980–1981)

Note :Pct = Winning percentage

References

Defunct Quebec Major Junior Hockey League teams
Sport in Sorel-Tracy
Ice hockey clubs established in 1969
Sports clubs disestablished in 1981
1969 establishments in Quebec
1981 disestablishments in Quebec